Louis Moyse (pron. moh-EEZ; 14 August 1912 – 30 July 2007) was a French flute player and composer. He was the son of influential French flutist Marcel Moyse, a co-founder of the Vermont Marlboro Music Festival, and taught many world-class flutists all over the world. He died of heart failure at age 94.

Louis Moyse was born in Scheveningen, Netherlands during one of his father's tours. His first flute teachers were his father and Philippe Gaubert. Louis Moyse was a member of the successful Moyse Trio where his father played flute, Louis played piano and his former wife, Blanche Honegger Moyse, violin.

Louis Moyse also taught for 27 years at Marlboro College, and was  professor at Boston University and the University of Toronto. He continued giving private lessons in Westport, New York while touring with his wife Janet White Moyse, of 33 years, around the world and the United States.  They later moved to Montpelier, Vermont, for the last nine years of his life. He also gave semiannual master classes and concerts in his hometown, St.-Amour, France, until 2004.

He is considered by some to be one of the most prolific producers of flute music worldwide, which has been published by G. Schirmer, Southern Music, Theodore Presser, McGinnis & Marx, E. Henry David Music Publishers, Leduc (France) and Zen-On (Japan). Works for Flute and Piano by Louis Moyse (CRI 888), performed by flutist Karen Kevra and pianist Paul Orgel, received a Grammy nomination in 2003.

Publications
Among his own compositions are:

 Suite for 2 flutes and alto (1957)
 Four dances for flute and viola (1958)
 Wind quintet (1961)
 Marlborian Concerto No 1, for flute, English horn, and orchestra (1969)
 First Sonata, for flute and piano (1974)
 Introduction, Theme and Variation, flute and piano (1980)

 Second Sonata, Op. 60, flute and piano (1998)
 Trois Hommages, flute and piano
 Two Miniatures, flute and piano
 Impromptu in B-Flat Major, Op.142, flute and piano
 Suite in a minor, flute and piano

Collections of flute music:

 Louis Moyse Flute Collection, Schirmer
 40 Little Pieces for Beginning Flutists
 Flute Music By French Composers, flute and piano
 Album Of Flute Duets, 2 flutes
 Twelve Fantasias for Solo Flute

 Solos for the Flute Player, flute and piano
 Album of Sonatinas for Young Flutists, flute and piano
 First Solos for the Flute Player, flute and piano
 Little Pieces for Flute and Guitar, flute and guitar

He has also edited flute music by others, such as Mozart's Flute Quartet K. 285.

See also
 Marcel Moyse

Notes

References
Marcel Moyse: Voice of the Flute by Ann McCutchan - Biography
New York Times Obituary

External links
Louis Moyse

Musicians from Vermont
1912 births
2007 deaths
French classical flautists
20th-century classical musicians
20th-century French musicians
Conservatoire de Paris alumni
Academic staff of the Conservatoire de Paris
Boston University faculty
Academic staff of the University of Toronto
20th-century flautists